Stubing is a surname, likely of German origin. Notable people with the surname include:

Moose Stubing (1938-2018), American professional baseball scout, minor league manager, and Major League Baseball third-base coach
Patrick Stübing (born 1976), German criminal
Solvi Stubing (1941-2017), German actress and TV personality